Pozzi is an Italian word, the plural form of Pozzo (which means a well), and may refer to:
 Pozzi, a località within Valeggio sul Mincio, Verona, Italy
 Pozzi (surname), an Italian surname
 Palazzo Pozzi Besana, Milan, palazzo in Milan, Italy

See also 

 Pozzo (disambiguation)